Tunic is an action-adventure game by Andrew Shouldice and published by Finji. The game was released in March 2022 on macOS, Windows, Xbox One, and Xbox Series X/S, which was followed by ports on the Nintendo Switch, PlayStation 4 and PlayStation 5 in September of the same year.

Gameplay
Tunic is played nominally in an isometric view, allowing the player to maneuver their character, an anthropomorphic fox, around the game's world, interacting with objects and fighting enemies; if necessary, the player can switch to a more top-down view in combat. The game is structured similarly to The Legend of Zelda, with progress limited to certain areas of the game world until the player has collected a new weapon or ability for the fox to use, adding some touches from the Dark Souls series. The game's purpose and method of playing are somewhat oblique; what dialog is presented to the player is generally of a strange language, though selected characters or words will be legible in the player's language that may hint towards puzzle solutions, and some of the items that the player will find are pages that make up the game's manual.

Plot
A fox cub awakens on a shore with only a scrap of the Game Manual guiding him to find the Sword, although he can not comprehend the language it's written in with the exception of a handful of words. The fox comes across the Temple, discovering the spirit of a larger fox (referred to as "the Heir") trapped in an enormous crystal prison, and the fox leaves to collect the three Crystal Keys which can be found within various dungeons across the land. Most of the local life has been driven mad and are obsessed with a toxic glowing purple fluid that powers a variety of ancient technology and various war machines. Additionally, the land is filled with many statues and monuments paying tribute to a fallen Hero. Every time the fox is killed by an enemy, he is revived by the Heir at one of the statues he'd stopped to pray at. He can also visit the imprisoned Heir on a spiritual plane known as the Far Shore.

During the fox's travels, he explores an underground factory where the souls of other foxes are forcibly confined into the boxes that are used to power the technology around the game world. After collecting the Keys and freeing the Heir, the Heir unexpectedly attacks and kills the fox. (In the unlikely scenario that the player is able to defeat the Heir on first attempt, the first ending immediately occurs.)

The fox, now in spirit form, is sent to the Night World, a darker version of the overworld. Most enemies have disappeared (with the exception of undead monsters) and the land is instead populated by the souls of other foxes, although he can not understand them similar to the Manual. The fox returns the Graves of the Hero, where he collects various parts of his spirit and returns to life.

Collecting enough pages of the Manual reveals the backstory. A fox called the Heir sought immortality and opened a forbidden tomb. However, this unleashed a curse upon the world and the Heir became trapped within a crystal prison until being freed a fox Hero. For unclear reasons, the roles of the Heir and the Hero are stuck in a cyclical narrative with the Hero freeing and then killing the Heir before replacing them in their prison and becoming the new Heir (the "Heir-to-the-Heir").

Now revived, the fox returns to the Far Shore to confront the Heir once more. The ending depends on whether he has collected every page of the Game Manual:
 If pages are still missing, the fox successfully defeats the Heir in battle, but he soon finds himself trapped in an identical prison the Heir was in and the Temple seals shut, cursing him to lie in wait for a new Hero to free him as the cycle repeats. However, a New Game+ mode gives the player the chance to return to the beginning to search for more pages.
 If the player has successfully collected all the pages, the fox shares his accumulated wisdom with the Heir by presenting the completed manual to her. Touched by the gesture, she recognizes the fox as a worthy Hero and her physical body is restored, forgoing the fight and breaking the cycle for good. As the credits roll, the fox and the freed Heir explore the land together.

Development
Tunic (originally named Secret Legend) was developed by Andrew Shouldice. Shouldice was a developer at Silverback Productions for about six years, and in 2015, having participated in a few Ludum Dare events, he wondered what he could produce if he worked full-time on Tunic rather than just on weekends. He considered the state of his own career at Silverback and decided to quit to pursue this development.

Shouldice stated the game was inspired by "certain classic triangle-seeking games," obliquely referring to The Legend of Zelda series. Within the game, the player finds pages of instruction manuals, the art which was heavily inspired by the instruction booklets for the Nintendo Entertainment System games The Legend of Zelda and Zelda II: The Adventure of Link. As he started working on the game, he gained interest from Finji, Adam Saltsman's publishing label. Finji offered to publish and help refine the game, taking some of the experience they had in preparing Moss for the PlayStation VR release. The game's soundtrack was composed by Lifeformed, who previously composed music for the 2012 game Dustforce, and Janice Kwan.

At the Electronic Entertainment Expo 2017's PC Gaming Show, the game, previously developed as Secret Legend, was renamed Tunic, along with Shouldice's collaboration with Finji to help publish it. The game was subsequently featured during Microsoft's presentation at E3 2018, where it was announced as a console launch exclusive to the Xbox One, alongside its planned release for Windows.

Tunic launched on March 16, 2022. In addition to macOS, Windows, and Xbox console releases, it also was added to Xbox Game Pass the same day.

Reception 

Tunic received "generally favorable" reviews according to review aggregator Metacritic.

Destructoid lauded Tunic's "celebration of long-forgotten design practices," praising its sense of exploration that hearkened back to classic titles of the past. IGN praised the game's aesthetics, instruction manual, enemy variety, moveset, boss battles, and world, while describing its narrative as interesting yet unsatisfying. Game Informer commended the amount of accessibility and combat options present, while also praising the Tunic's challenge, combat, puzzles, and attention to detail, writing that the game "...[was] so well designed" to the point where "...the obscureness that [made] it uniquely rewarding [could] lead to genuine frustration." Eurogamer gave the game an 'Essential' rating, writing, "Zelda and Souls combined - not merely the iconography or the main beats. Rather, Tunic is the understanding gained by playing both and really thinking about why they are the way they are - how they create, as a magician might put it, their particular effects." GameSpot and Shacknews cited the visual style, world, language barrier, instruction manual, and enemy design as the game's positives while taking minor issue with some particularly obtuse puzzles, minor enemy AI issues, and restrictive fast travel.

The Verge enjoyed Tunic's in-game guide book, "the manual is a joy to flip through, featuring full-page maps, beautiful illustrations of items and characters, and charming artwork of the game’s fox character, and they all make poring over the pages a lot of fun". Rock Paper Shotgun liked the game's world, feeling it had a large amount of hidden areas to find, "Exploration is king... There are labyrinths of invisible walls and, yes, secluded paths veiled by waterfalls, and plentiful shortcuts kept out of sight thanks to quirks of perspective. An absolute joy to me, the shortcut liker". Polygon praised the game's puzzles, feeling they respected the player's intelligence, "Some of these puzzles are ones that I might never solve —at least, not on my own. But I trust the game, and it seems like the game trusts me, too. It never signposts the next step too clearly. VG247 felt the visuals gave the world an added charm, writing "It's inspired by isometric games, but isn't afraid to pull the camera out, twist it around, shunt it into a corner or whatever else to give you a sense of place... you'll find the camera zooms, pans or rolls on a whim, highlighting whatever part of the dustily-lit toybox world works best in the moment".

Accolades

References

External links
 

2022 video games
Action-adventure games
Finji games
Games financed by Indie Fund
Indie video games
Interactive Achievement Award winners
MacOS games
Nintendo Switch games
PlayStation 4 games
PlayStation 5 games
Retro-style video games
Single-player video games
Video games about foxes
Video games developed in Canada
Video games set in forests
Video games with alternate endings
Video games with isometric graphics
Windows games
Xbox One games
Xbox Series X and Series S games